Tomás Alexis Oneto (born 19 February 1998) is an Argentine professional footballer who plays as a centre-back for C.D. Universidad Católica del Ecuador.

Career
Oneto began his senior career with Talleres, a team he spent his youth career with; featuring for the U20s at the 2018 U-20 Copa Libertadores in Uruguay, making three appearances. He left the club on loan in July 2018, joining Istra 1961 of the Croatian First Football League. Oneto's debut arrived on 12 August during a 3–0 defeat against Osijek. Eleven more matches followed. In January 2019, Oneto switched Croatia for Spain by agreeing a move to Tercera División side Alavés B. He won promotion with them to Segunda División B, though didn't feature much due to injuries. He returned to Talleres at the end of 2019.

January 2020 saw Oneto head out to Ecuadorian Serie A outfit Aucas. He'd appear just five times due to the COVID-19 pandemic, though did make his first appearances in the Copa Sudamericana versus Vélez Sarsfield in February. In the succeeding October, Oneto signed for All Boys of Primera B Nacional on a free transfer; penning a contract until December 2021. He was sent off twice in his first five appearances.

Career statistics
.

References

External links

1998 births
Living people
Footballers from Buenos Aires
Argentine footballers
Association football defenders
Argentine expatriate footballers
Expatriate footballers in Croatia
Expatriate footballers in Spain
Expatriate footballers in Ecuador
Argentine expatriate sportspeople in Croatia
Argentine expatriate sportspeople in Spain
Argentine expatriate sportspeople in Ecuador
Croatian Football League players
Tercera División players
Segunda División B players
Ecuadorian Serie A players
Primera Nacional players
Talleres de Córdoba footballers
NK Istra 1961 players
Deportivo Alavés B players
S.D. Aucas footballers
All Boys footballers